Jigaon is a village in Nandura tehsil of Buldhana district of Maharashtra. A major project is being built on Purna River. 

Villages in Buldhana district